Abdel Wahab Abdel Razeq is a Egyptian senator, elected as the Senate President on 18 October 2020. He was Chancellor of Supreme Constitutional Court Egypt until 2018.

Abdel Razek, a judge of the Supreme Court, was born 1948 in Minya, he earned his bachelor's degree in law from Cairo University in 1969 and got appointment as assistant prosecutor into the Accountability State Authority in 1971, he became the permanent secretary to Attorney General in the Ministry of Justice and also deputy secretary in the State Council in 1987. He became a prosecutor in the State Council in 1989 and rose to be the adviser to commissioners authority of Supreme Constitutional Court until 1994 of which became the head in the authority that was until 2011 he rose to the deputy Chancellor of Supreme Constitutional Court, although he was one time the legal consultant to the Kuwaiti Cabinet was from 1992 to 1998.

Chancellor of the Court 
He became Chancellor of the Court in May 2016 after serving as the deputy since 2011,  he left in June 2018 after a two-year term.

He joined the Supreme Constitutional Court in 2011 as deputy, he was appointed as alternative to his predecessor due to an age limit retirement in May 2016, he was appointed under 2014 Constitution Article 193. As a courts panel commissioners member, he was among the judges who were in favour of dissolving the 2012s Parliament which at the time were mostly occupied by the parliament of the Muslim Brotherhood and Salafists. Still in the Court, he also partakes the issued rulings in favour of invalidating the political disenfranchisement law of the old Shura Council that was in control of Muslim Brotherhood movement.

Party 
He is also the chairman of the Future of a Homeland chosen by the party members of the Parliament. He served as a member of 2014 Presidential Election Committee and was a member in the foundation of the Future of a Homeland Party along with the President Abdel-Fatah El-Sisi in 2014.

Votes 
He received 287 votes of 300 cast.

References

External links 

 

1948 births
Living people
Scholars of constitutional law
20th-century Egyptian lawyers
Cairo University alumni
People from Minya Governorate
21st-century Egyptian judges